Walter de Stapledon (or Stapeldon) (1 February 126114 October 1326) was Bishop of Exeter 1308–1326 and twice Lord High Treasurer of England, in 1320 and 1322. He founded Exeter College, Oxford and contributed liberally to the rebuilding of Exeter Cathedral.  His tomb and monument, of great architectural importance, survives in Exeter Cathedral. He was killed by a mob during the London uprising.

Origins

Walter Stapledon was born either at Stapledon in the parish of Cookbury, North Devon or at
Annery in the parish of Monkleigh. He was the son of Sir Richard Stapledon, descended from a noble stock. The Stapledons originated at the estate of Stapledon, in the parish of Cookbury, near Holsworthy, Devon. His elder brother was Richard Stapledon (died 1326) of Annery, a judge, whose monument survives in Exeter Cathedral near that of his brother the bishop.

Career
Stapledon became professor of canon law at Oxford and chaplain to Pope Clement V. On 13 March 1307 he was appointed Bishop of Exeter, and was consecrated on 13 October 1308. Two months later the bishop conducted at Crediton the largest ordination in the history of the diocese of Exeter: the ordinands numbered 1005. A large proportion of them were from Cornwall and the remainder from Devon. Large numbers received minor orders and, among the Cornish, only 42 as priests or deacons.

He went on embassies to France for both Kings Edward I and Edward II, and attended the councils and parliaments of his time. He was twice appointed Lord High Treasurer of England, in 1320 and 1322,

Founds Exeter College, Oxford
Stapeldon founded Exeter College, Oxford, which originated in Stapeldon Hall, established in 1314 by the bishop and his elder brother, Sir Richard Stapeldon, a judge of the king's bench, whose monument with effigy also exists in Exeter Cathedral near to that of his brother. The college was much frequented by sons of the Devonshire gentry for many centuries. The armorials of the college are those of Bishop Stapledon.

Death and burial

Stapledon was associated in the popular mind with the misdeeds of King Edward II. On fleeing London before the advancing troops of Queen Isabella, that king appointed Stapledon  or "Keeper" of the City of London, the population of which was mostly in favour of the Queen. Foreseeing her forced entry into the City, Stapledon demanded from the Lord Mayor of London the keys to the gates, to lock her out. The following account is related by William de Dene in his History of the See of Rochester. A gathering of bishops took place at Lambeth Palace, south of the River Thames, aimed at arranging a mission of two of their number to convene peace talks between the warring king and queen in St Paul's Cathedral in the City. However all the bishops were wary of crossing the Thames into London, where the population was known to be hostile to them. Eventually The Bishop of London and Stapledon, Bishop of Exeter, appear to have volunteered and crossed the Thames to convene at the Blackfriars, just outside the City gates. Here they met with a group of the Kings Justices (possibly therefore including Sir Richard de Stapledon, the bishop's brother). When the Londoners heard of this they met in the Guildhall and plotted how to ambush, capture and kill the two bishops, and then loot the merchants, and sent out scouting parties to report on the route of their journey. The plot came to fruition when Stapledon was ambushed on his journey. He was accompanied by his elder brother Richard de Stapledon, a Justice of Assizes for the western circuit, who in trying to save him was dragged from his horse and murdered. This is said by John Prince to have happened as he rode through the city gate of Cripplegate, when a cripple grasped one of the forelegs of Sir Richard's horse and by crossing it threw the horse and rider to the ground, whereupon Sir Richard was murdered by the mob. Sir Richard's elaborate monument with effigies survives in Exeter Cathedral, near to that of his brother the bishop . The bishop fled for safety into St Paul's Cathedral. However he found no safety there as a mob entered and dragged him out and proceeded to beat and wound him and dragged him to the Great Cross at Cheapside "where those sons of the devil most barborously murdered him" on 15 October 1326. His head was chopped off and his body was thrown onto a dunghill "to be torn and devoured by dogs". Later some of his supporters took away his body and re-buried it in the sand of the shoreline of the River Thames next to the bishop's palace, Exeter House, beyond Temple Bar on The Strand, which site was later occupied by Essex House, the townhouse of the Earl of Essex during the reign of Queen Elizabeth I. About six months later the Queen "reflecting how dishonourable a thing it was to suffer the corps of so truly great and good prelate to lie thus vilely buried" ordered his body to be disinterred and removed for burial in Exeter Cathedral, "there to be honoured with most magnificent exequies", which duly occurred on 28 March 1327.

Epitaph by John Hooker
A lengthy epitaph in Latin verse was later composed by John Hooker (died 1601) and was inscribed on a heavy wooden tablet erected in 1568 over his tomb at the expense of Bishop William Alleigh. This was still in place at the time of Prince, who transcribed it. It was destroyed in 1805 by Bishop John Fisher, who erected in its place coronet-work in gilded stone. A shorter Latin eulogy inscribed on three white marble tablets survives attached to the north (rear) side of the monument.

Monument

Stapledon's monument is located in Exeter Cathedral in the choir on the north side of the high altar, and is the cathedral's most important 14th-century monument. It consists of a recumbent effigy within a gothic canopy all made of Beer stone. The colour scheme dates from an early 19th-century restoration since restored again (see below). The effigy is shown in pontificalibus and holds in his left hand a crozier and in his right hand a book. On the outside of the tomb at his feet is shown a heraldic escutcheon bearing the bishop's arms. On the ceiling of the canopy, invisible to the casual observer, but looking down onto the bishop's effigy is a contemporary painting of Christ displaying his Five Holy Wounds. In 1733 the monument was repaired at the cost of Exeter College, Oxford, his foundation, and was apparently re-painted with bright colours. In the summer of 1805 however at the direction of Bishop John Fisher (reg.1803–1807) the removal was effected of "the gaudy colours with which the whole of the monument had been painted". In the late 1950s the monument was restored and recoloured. In the 1980s the mediaeval painting on the ceiling of the canopy was restored.

Citations

References

 
 

Stapledon, Walter de
Stapledon, Walter de
Bishops of Exeter
14th-century English Roman Catholic bishops
Lord High Treasurers of England
Burials at Exeter Cathedral
People associated with Exeter College, Oxford
Founders of colleges of the University of Oxford